Rajkumar (English: Prince) is a 1996 Indian Hindi historical fantasy film directed by Pankaj Parashar. The film stars Anil Kapoor, Madhuri Dixit, Naseeruddin Shah and Sanjay Mishra in the lead roles. The film was a disaster at the box office.

Plot
Rani Maa's (Reena Roy) husband is killed by the neighbouring kingdom's evil Prime Minister Man Singh (Naseeruddin Shah). The Prime Minister absolves himself from this killing and blames it on the king, the father of Rajkumari Vishaka (Madhuri Dixit). Rani Maa swears to avenge the death against the Rajkumari. Man Singh also has a twin brother, Surjan Singh (also Naseeruddin Shah), who is not evil at all, albeit a little naive. Rani Maa is shocked and aghast when she finds out that her only son, Rajkumar (Anil Kapoor) is in love with Rajkumari. She sets out to oppose this marriage, while Rajkumar will leave no stone unturned to marry Rajkumari. The stage is set for mother and son to decide whether it is in their best interest to include someone in the family who has killed a husband and a father respectively.

Cast 
 Anil Kapoor... Rajkumar 
 Madhuri Dixit... Rajkumari Vishaka
 Naseeruddin Shah... Man Singh/Surjan Singh
 Danny Denzongpa... Ali
 Saeed Jaffrey... Bhanuwala
 Reena Roy... Rani Maa
 Farida Jalal... Panna (Dai maa)
 Sanjay Mishra
 Vijayendra Ghatge
 Aruna Irani
 Arun Bali
Pradeep Rawat

Soundtrack 
The soundtrack was composed by Laxmikant-Pyarelal, and the lyrics were penned by Anand Bakshi. "Payal Meri" is based on "Faith" by George Michael.

 "Payal Meri" [5:55]  -  Alka Yagnik, Udit Narayan
 "Yeh Khubsoorat Badan" [7:01]  -  Alka Yagnik
 "Aankhon Ke Aage Peeche" [7:40]  -  Kavita Krishnamurthy
 "Aaja Aaja Tu Aanewale" [6:30]  -  Iqbal Afzai, Sabri, Sukhwinder Singh, Jayshree Shivram
 "Bechain Hoon Main" [5:12]  -  Alka Yagnik, Udit Narayan
 "O Mere Rajkumar" [04:47]  -  Alka Yagnik
 "Tu Bijli Hai" [05:51]  -  Alka Yagnik, Udit Narayan

Notes

External links

1996 films
1990s Hindi-language films
Films scored by Laxmikant–Pyarelal
Films about royalty
Indian historical fantasy films
Indian romantic musical films
Indian musical fantasy films
Indian epic films
Historical epic films
Romantic epic films
Epic fantasy films
Indian fantasy action films
Indian historical musical films
1990s historical romance films
1990s romantic fantasy films
Indian historical romance films
Films directed by Pankuj Parashar
Indian historical action films